Terra Alta is a town in eastern Preston County, West Virginia, United States. The population was 1,415 at the 2020 census. It is part of the Morgantown metropolitan area.

History

Terra Alta was originally called Portland, and under the latter name had its start in the 1850s. The present name Terra Alta is derived from Latin meaning "high land". According to the 1876 Baltimore and Ohio Railroad map, Terra Alta had a railroad station called Cranberry Station.

The town is home to the James S. Lakin House and Terra Alta Bank, each listed on the National Register of Historic Places.

Geography
Terra Alta is located at  (39.444343, -79.544002).

Climate
The climate in this area has mild differences between highs and lows, and there is adequate rainfall year-round.  According to the Köppen Climate Classification system, Terra Alta has a humid continental climate, abbreviated "Dfb" on climate maps.

Demographics

2010 census
As of the census of 2010, there were 1,477 people, 610 households, and 394 families living in the town. The racial makeup of the town was 98.0% White, 0.7% African American, 0.5% Native American, 0.1% Asian, 0.2% from other races, and 0.5% from two or more races. Hispanic or Latino of any race were 0.9% of the population.

There were 610 households, of which 33.0% had children under the age of 18 living with them, 45.1% were married couples living together, 14.6% had a female householder with no husband present, 4.9% had a male householder with no wife present, and 35.4% were non-families. 28.7% of all households were made up of individuals, and 10.6% had someone living alone who was 65 years of age or older. The average household size was 2.41 and the average family size was 2.92.

The median age in the town was 38.8 years. 24.4% of residents were under the age of 18; 8.4% were between the ages of 18 and 24; 26.1% were from 25 to 44; 27.2% were from 45 to 64; and 13.9% were 65 years of age or older. The gender makeup of the town was 47.2% male and 52.8% female.

2000 census
As of the census of 2000, there were 1,456 people, 596 households, and 417 families living in the town. The population density was 1,220.1 inhabitants per square mile (472.4/km2). There were 690 housing units at an average density of 578.2 per square mile (223.9/km2). The racial makeup of the town was 99.18% White, 0.14% African American, 0.07% Asian, 0.07% Pacific Islander, 0.07% from other races, and 0.48% from two or more races. Hispanic or Latino of any race were 0.34% of the population.

There were 596 households, out of which 32.6% had children under the age of 18 living with them, 53.2% were married couples living together, 12.6% had a female householder with no husband present, and 30.0% were non-families. 26.2% of all households were made up of individuals, and 12.2% had someone living alone who was 65 years of age or older. The average household size was 2.43 and the average family size was 2.90.

In the town, the population was spread out, with 24.5% under the age of 18, 8.2% from 18 to 24, 26.5% from 25 to 44, 26.0% from 45 to 64, and 14.9% who were 65 years of age or older. The median age was 38 years. For every 100 females, there were 88.6 males. For every 100 females age 18 and over, there were 85.2 males.

The median income for a household in the town was $25,388, and the median income for a family was $32,692. Males had a median income of $23,750 versus $17,950 for females. The per capita income for the town was $12,040. About 15.6% of families and 18.9% of the population were below the poverty line, including 31.5% of those under age 18 and 8.9% of those age 65 or over.

References

Towns in Preston County, West Virginia
Towns in West Virginia
Morgantown metropolitan area
Coal towns in West Virginia